Hiram Rapids is an unincorporated community in Portage County, in the U.S. state of Ohio.

History
A variant name was Rapids. A post office was established in 1840, and remained in operation until 1912.

References

Unincorporated communities in Portage County, Ohio
Unincorporated communities in Ohio